Nelio Dallolio was an American college football head coach at New Jersey State Teachers College at Glassboro (now called Rowan University), an NCAA Division III program in Glassboro, New Jersey. He was the second head coach for the Profs and compiled a 12–6–1 record in three seasons (1948–1950).

Head coaching record

References

Year of birth uncertain
Year of death uncertain
Rowan Profs football coaches